Feniks may refer to:

Feniks Island

Music
Feniks, charting Polish album by Kasia Cerekwicka 2006
Feniks, album by Croatian duo Colonia (music group)
Feniks (Aria album), Russian heavy metal album (2011)

Other
Yantar-2K satellite
FC Feniks-Illichovets Kalinine
FC Feniks Drenas

See also
 Fenix (disambiguation)
 Phoenix (disambiguation)